An Islamic monarchy is a monarchy which adheres to Islam as its state religion and is an Islamic state fully governed by Sharia. Historically came under various forms, such as Mamlakah ("Kingdom"), Caliphate, Sultanate, or Emirate, current Islamic monarchies include:
 Kingdom of Bahrain
 Brunei Darussalam
 State of Kuwait
 Malaysia
 Kingdom of Morocco
 Sultanate of Oman
 State of Qatar
 Kingdom of Saudi Arabia
 United Arab Emirates